Pitchstone Publishing is a publishing company based in Durham, North Carolina. Founded by Kurt Volkan in 2003, Pitchstone Publishing has published numerous books by leading academics and scholars, particularly in the fields of secular humanism, new atheism, applied psychiatry, and psychoanalysis.

Notable books

 Attack of the Theocrats! How the Religious Right Harms Us All – and What We Can Do About It (2012) by Sean Faircloth 
 Blind Trust: Leaders and Their Followers in Times of Crisis and Terror (2018) by Vamık Volkan 
 Caught in the Pulpit: Leaving Religion Behind (2017) by Daniel Dennett and Linda LaScola 
 The Ebony Exodus Project: Why Some Black Women Are Walking Out on Religion—and Others Should Too (2013) by Candace R. M. Gorham
 God Bless America: Strange and Unusual Religious Beliefs and Practices in the United States (2013) by Karen Stollznow 
 Humanists in the Hood: Unapologetically Black, Feminist, and Heretical (2020) by Sikivu Hutchinson 
 Killing in the Name of Identity: A Study of Bloody Conflicts (2014) by Vamik Volkan 
 A Manual for Creating Atheists (2013) by Peter Boghossian 
 PsychoBible: Behavior, Religion and the Holy Book (2003) by Armando Favazza 
 The Rise and Fall of Faith: A God-to-Godless Story for Christians and Atheists (2017) by Drew Bekius 
 Why We Believe in God(s): A Concise Guide to the Science of Faith (2011) by J. Anderson Thomson, Jr.

Notes

External links
 

Book publishing companies based in Virginia
New Atheism
Publishing companies established in 2003